Celso Emilio Ferreiro Míguez (1912–1979) was a Galicianist activist, writer, poet, and political journalist.

Early years

Ferreiro was born in Celanova, into a well-off Galicianist family. In 1932, at the age of twenty, he created the Mocedades Galeguistas de Celanova (Galicianist Youths of Celanova) with Xosé Velo Mosquera. In 1934 he also participated in the creation of the Federación de Mocedades Galeguistas (Federation of Galicianist Youths). Some time after this Ferreiro got into trouble because of an article published in his magazine Guieiro.

Francoist Spain
Ferreiro was mobilized in the Spanish Civil War by the Nationalist troops. He studied law, and contributed to many magazines and newspapers over the period of the Francoist State. 

In 1966 Ferreiro travelled to Venezuela, where he collaborated with the Galician Brotherhood. He fell out with the Galician nationalists in Venezuela, and in response published the poetry collection Viaxe ao pais dos ananos (Journey to the land of the dwarves). He founded the Patronato da Cultura Galega (Patronage of Galician Culture), and was part of President Rafael Caldera's cabinet.

Later life
After returning to Spain Ferreiro lived in Madrid, where he worked as a journalist. He wrote in Galician and in Castilian, but his most important work was his Galician-language poetry. "Longa noite de pedra" ("Long night of stone"), a lament at the anti-Galician policies of Francoist Spain, is one of the best-known and most powerful Galician poems of all time.

Death
Ferreiro died in Vigo, Galicia, Spain in 1979. The Día das Letras Galegas (Galician Literature Day) was dedicated to Celso Emilio in 1989.

Books
Cartafol de poesía (A poetry folder)
O sono sulagado (The drowned dream)
Viaxe ao país dos ananos (Journey to the land of the dwarves)
Terra de ningures (Nowhere's land)
Onde o mundo se chama Celanova (Where the world is called Celanova)
Longa noite de pedra (Long night of stone)
Cimeterio privado (Private cemetery)

Writers from Galicia (Spain)
1912 births
1979 deaths